Issy Bailey (born 19 April 1994) is a British paralympic sports shooter. She competed in Rio at the 2016 Summer Paralympics and she competed at the 2020 Summer Paralympics in Tokyo.

Life
Bailey was born in 1994, and was brought up in Somerford Keynes, near Cirencester. She attended nearby Rendcomb College, where she first tried shooting. As her first sport was hockey, when she played lacrosse for her school she would usually move the ball on the ground rather than in the air. In 2013, when she was nineteen and attending Exeter University, she was seriously injured in a car accident. Bailey was taken to hospital and placed in a five-day coma while doctors treated her damaged spine, broken back, liver, and ribs. She lost the use of her legs and the full use of her left hand.

While she was recovering at Stoke Mandeville Hospital, she was offered several sports, but had so many injuries to her body that shooting seemed to be the best option. She took to the sport and joined the GB squad in 2014. Her education at Exeter University continued a year later than planned and she graduated with a degree in English. She later took up wheelchair rugby and wheelchair basketball and earned a masters degree in "Global Literatures and Cultures" at Exeter in 2021.

Bailey did not qualify for the 2016 Summer Paralympics in Rio but was given a wildcard, so she attended the event along with her friend and fellow pistol shooter Stewart Nangle. She did not win a medal but instead finished in 14th place in the Women's 10 metre air pistol SH1. Stewart Nangle retired in 2018 leaving Bailey as the only pistol shooter on the British team.

When the teams were announced for the postponed 2020 Summer Paralympics in Tokyo, Bailey was included after her ninth-place finish in Sydney at the 2019 World Championships. The other British women shooters bound for Tokyo are Olympians Kirsty Hegarty (women’s Olympic trap) and Seonaid McIntosh and Paralympians Lorraine Lambert and Lesley Stewart, but Bailey will be the only British pistol shooter. She competed in the 10m air pistol SH1 and mixed 25m pistol SH1. She narrowly missed out on making the finals despite a personalbest performance.

Private life
Bailey's partner is fellow shooter Matt Skelhon. She has learned from his Paralympic experiences, and as they are both elite athletes they travel and compete together.

References 

1994 births
Living people
People from Cirencester
British female sport shooters
Shooters at the 2020 Summer Paralympics
People educated at Rendcomb College
Alumni of the University of Exeter
Paralympic shooters of Great Britain
Shooters at the 2016 Summer Paralympics
21st-century British women